Enekpedekumoh Okporu (born 11 April 1962) is a Nigerian wrestler. He competed in the men's freestyle 82 kg at the 1992 Summer Olympics.

References

1962 births
Living people
Nigerian male sport wrestlers
Olympic wrestlers of Nigeria
Wrestlers at the 1992 Summer Olympics
Place of birth missing (living people)
20th-century Nigerian people